Ngaoundéré Airport , also known as N'Gaoundéré Airport, is an airport serving Ngaoundéré (also spelled N'Gaoundéré), the capital of the Adamawa Province in Cameroon.

Airlines and destinations

References

External links
 
 

Airports in Cameroon